John Egerton, 3rd Earl of Bridgewater KB PC (9 November 1646 – 19 March 1701) was a British nobleman from the Egerton family.

He was the eldest son of John Egerton, 2nd Earl of Bridgewater and his wife Elizabeth Cavendish. His maternal grandparents were William Cavendish, 1st Duke of Newcastle and his first wife Elizabeth Basset.

On 17 November 1664, he married Lady Elizabeth Cranfield, daughter of James Cranfield, 2nd Earl of Middlesex.  She gave birth to a son, but died in childbirth.  He married his second wife on 2 April 1673, Lady Jane Paulet, eldest daughter of Charles Paulet, 1st Duke of Bolton.

Egerton served as a Member of Parliament for Buckinghamshire as a Whig for Buckinghamshire from 1685 to 1686.  He also served as Lord Lieutenant of Buckinghamshire following his father's death in 1686 but was dismissed after his first period in office by King James II for refusing to produce a list of Roman Catholics to serve as officers of the militia.  He was later reinstated to the position when William III came to the throne and James II was forced into exile.

He served as First Lord of Trade in the Convention Parliament, 1690–1691.  He was promoted to the cabinet as First Lord of the Admiralty by the Whigs in 1699. He served in this position until March 1700/1.

He was chosen as a Speaker for the House of Lords in 1697 and then again for 1701.

Family 

He was first married to Elizabeth Cranfield, a daughter of James Cranfield, 2nd Earl of Middlesex and Anne Bourchier. They had only one known child who survived birth:

John Cranfield (11 January 1668 – 31 March 1670).

On 2 April 1673, Bridgewater married his second wife Jane Paulet. She was a daughter of Charles Paulet, 1st Duke of Bolton and his second wife Mary Scrope. Mary was the eldest illegitimate daughter of Emanuel Scrope, 1st Earl of Sunderland, and his mistress Martha Jones; she became her father's co-heiress when a brother died childless. They had nine children:

Charles Egerton, Viscount Brackley (7 May 1675 – April 1687) died at age 11 at Bridgwater House, the Barbican, London, England, burnt to death in the fire which destroyed Bridgwater House. He was buried on 14 April 1687 at Little Gaddesden, Hertfordshire, England.
Lady Mary Egerton (14 May 1676 – 11 April 1704). Married William Byron, 4th Baron Byron
Hon. Thomas Egerton (15 August 1679 – April 1687) died at age 7 at Bridgwater House, the Barbican, London, England, burnt to death in the fire which destroyed Bridgwater House. He was buried on 14 April 1687 at Little Gaddesden, Hertfordshire, England.
Scroop Egerton, 1st Duke of Bridgewater (11 August 1681 – 11 January 1744/5)
Hon. William Egerton (1684-1732), MP and soldier
Hon. Henry Egerton, Bishop of Hereford (10 February 1689 – 1 April 1746). Married Elizabeth Ariana Bentinck, a daughter of William Bentinck, 1st Earl of Portland and his second wife Jane Martha Temple. They were parents to John Egerton, Bishop of Durham.
Hon. John Egerton (d. c.1707), a Page of Honour
Hon. Charles Egerton (d. 7 November 1725). Married Catherine Greville. His wife was a sister of William Greville, 7th Baron Brooke.
Lady Elizabeth Egerton. Married Thomas Catesby Paget. Her husband was a son of Henry Paget, 1st Earl of Uxbridge and his wife Mary Catesby. They were parents of Henry Paget, 2nd Earl of Uxbridge.

References

Bibliography

 
 
 

1646 births
1701 deaths
17th-century English nobility
18th-century English nobility
17th-century Royal Navy personnel
18th-century Royal Navy personnel
03
Knights of the Bath
Lord-Lieutenants of Buckinghamshire
Lords of the Admiralty
Brackley, John Egerton, Viscount
People from Buckinghamshire
John
Presidents of the Board of Trade
Whig (British political party) politicians